The Salat is a river in southern France, a right tributary of the Garonne. It rises in nine points above the hamlet Salau in the municipality Couflens, on the slopes of Mont Rouch, central Pyrenees. The former Gascon province of Couserans is based on its valley.

Departments and Cities 

 Ariège: Saint-Girons
 Haute-Garonne: Salies-du-Salat, Boussens.

Main tributaries 

 Alet
 Garbet
 Arac
 Lez
 Baup
 Arbas

References

Rivers of France
Rivers of Ariège (department)
Rivers of Haute-Garonne
Rivers of Occitania (administrative region)